Macotasa tortricoides is a moth of the family Erebidae. It is found on Borneo. The habitat consists of  lowland areas.

References

 Natural History Museum Lepidoptera generic names catalog

Lithosiina
Moths described in 1862

Moths of Borneo